Kapileshwar Temple is situated in the Rahika region of Madhubani District, Bihar, India. A Shiva Linga was placed at this temple by a Kapila sage. The site is located in Rahika Vidhan Sabha constituency. This is one of the famous shiva temples in Madhubani District.
It has a big pond outside the temple people from there take water for shivlinga. It is surrounded by villages like Kharaua, Rampur and Jagat. In the month of Shrawan people from different part of Bihar comes for Jalabhishek of shivlinga. The temple has a big boundary and in the centre of it Lord Shiva temple is situated whereas there are another temple also inside the boundary of it like Parvati temple, Hanuman Temple etc. There are many sculpture here is from history.

See Also
Kapila
Ancient Mithila University
Kapila Theertham

References

Tourist attractions in Madhubani district
Hindu temples in Bihar
Shiva_temples_in_Bihar